Lee Han-beom (born 17 June 2002) is a South Korean professional football player who plays for FC Seoul.

Club career 
Lee Han-beom joined FC Seoul in 2021.

He made his professional debut for FC Seoul on the 21 April 2021.

International career 
He was part of the South Korea squad at the 2019 FIFA U-17 World Cup.

Career statistics

Club

References

External links

2002 births
Living people
South Korean footballers
South Korea youth international footballers
Association football defenders
FC Seoul players
K League 1 players